Sto. Rosario Sapang Palay College, Inc. (SRSPC) is a Catholic educational institution in San Jose del Monte City, Bulacan, Philippines. It is operated by the Diocese of Malolos. It offers the Bachelor of Arts and Bachelor of Science degrees. It also offers preschool through high school education.

Mission and Vision

Vision Statement
Sto. Rosario Sapang Palay College, Inc. SRSPC, a Catholic educational Institution, inspired by the charism of the Our Lady of the Holy Rosary, forms Christ-centered and service-oriented individuals through the harmonious integration of knowledge, culture, and faith.

Mission Statement
Guided by its vision, SRSPC commits to produce graduates who are intellectually bright and morally upright members of the society; willing to serve the lost, the least, and the last; and become lead agents of social transformation, through 4A's:

-Academic Excellence

-Advanced Research

-Active Community Extension Services

-Authentic Christian Formation

Core Values: Prayer, Humility, Simplicity, Charity and Wisdom.

High School Department Strands for Senior High School

School Events

Brief history
Sto. Rosario Sapang Palay College is a Catholic Diocesan Institution of the Diocese of Malolos, a member of the Malolos Diocesan Association (MADICSA) and Catholic Education of the Philippines (CEAP).

SRSPC was formerly known as Assumption Sapang Palay College, Inc., which is closely linked with the Sapang Palay Resettlement and Sto. Rosario Parish of Sapang Palay.

Logo and motto

The three doves
The dove signifies the Triune God. The infant Jesus at the center carried in the loving arms of the Blessed Mother is the revelation of the Holy Trinity.

Sun
It symbolizes the Roman's sun day. However, as early as the second century, Christian called Christ as the Sun. This day is also attributed to the day of Christ's resurrection.

Mountain
It represents the location of the school which is mountainous. It is in one of the barangays of the City of San Jose del Monte, Bulacan.

Brook/rivulet or flowing water
The small river/rivulet or brook called "sapa" in Tagalog depicts the location of the school at Sapang Palay. Water is associated with the triple pouring of water at baptism.

First field
It represents the paddies where the "palay" are planted and harvested. Rice is a staple food of the Filipinos. It also denotes the exact site of the school. It is called "Sapa ng Palay". It is closely linked with the Israelites story in Exodus, their hasty departure from Egypt, from slavery to freedom.

Second field
This yields a harvest for the wheat and the grapes. These wheat and grapes are made into the bread and wine which are transformed into the body and blood of Christ in the Holy Eucharist in the process called transubstantiation.

Four houses or homes
These represent the basic ecclesiastical communities, the Catholic Christian Community of Sapang Palay.

References

Universities and colleges in Bulacan
Education in San Jose del Monte